Pat Patrick is the name of:

Pat Patrick (musician) (1929–1991), jazz saxophonist and bassist
Pat Patrick (auto racing) (1929–2021), auto racing team owner